Mudlark was a Sheffield-based production company that developed  Chromaroma, a game that used players’ Oyster cards and Barclays Cycle Hire accounts.
Points were awarded depending on the stations and journeys users complete on the London Underground and London Buses, as well as using ‘Boris bikes’.
 It was described by its creators, Mudlark, as “location-based top trumps”, and encouraged competition through leaderboards.

The game was launched to the public on 30 November 2010, when snow closed Gatwick Airport and caused severe delays on London's tube network. It was funded by Channel 4's 4ip Digital Investment fund.

Mudlark was also noted for developing, writing and performing Such Tweet Sorrow with the Royal Shakespeare Company.

References 

Internet properties established in 2009